The term benchmark, bench mark, or survey benchmark originates from the chiseled horizontal marks that surveyors made in stone structures, into which an angle-iron could be placed to form a "bench" for a leveling rod, thus ensuring that a leveling rod could be accurately repositioned in the same place in the future. These marks were usually indicated with a chiseled arrow below the horizontal line.

The term is generally applied to any item used to mark a point as an elevation reference.  Frequently, bronze or aluminum disks are set in stone or concrete, or on rods driven deeply into the earth to provide a stable elevation point. If an elevation is marked on a map, but there is no physical mark on the ground, it is a spot height.

Purpose

The height of a benchmark is calculated relative to the heights of nearby benchmarks in a network extending from a fundamental benchmark.  A fundamental benchmark is a point with a precisely known relationship to the vertical datum of the area, typically mean sea level. The position and height of each benchmark is shown on large-scale maps.

The terms "height" and "elevation" are often used interchangeably, but in many jurisdictions they have specific meanings; "height" commonly refers to a local or relative difference in the vertical (such as the height of a building), whereas "elevation" refers to the difference from a nominated reference surface (such as sea-level, or a mathematical/geodetic model that approximates the sea level known as the geoid).  Elevation may be specified as normal height (above a reference ellipsoid), orthometric height, or dynamic height which have slightly different definitions.

Other types of survey marks 

Triangulation points, also known as trig points, are marks with a precisely established horizontal position. These points may be marked by disks similar to benchmark disks, but set horizontally, and are also sometimes used as elevation benchmarks. Prominent features on buildings such as the tip of a church spire or a chimney stack are also used as reference points for triangulation. In the United Kingdom triangulation points are often set in large concrete markers that, as well as functioning as triangulation points, have a benchmark set into the side. With the increasing use of GPS and electronic distance measuring devices, the same techniques and equipment are used to fix the horizontal and vertical position of a survey marker at the same moment, and therefore the marks are usually regarded as "fixed in three dimensions".

Flush brackets are metal plates placed flush into the faces of buildings or other structures. Although many are attached to triangulation pillars as above, Non-Pillar Flush Brackets were also frequently located in the faces of buildings.

Agencies responsible for benchmarks

Benchmarks are typically placed ("monumented") by a government agency or private survey firm, and many governments maintain a register of these marks so that the records are available to all. These records are usually in the form of a geographically searchable database (computer or map-based), with links to sketches, diagrams, photos of the marks, and any other technical details.

Government agencies that place and maintain records of benchmarks include:

 Canada
 Natural Resources Canada (Geodetic Survey Division)
 Denmark
 GST
 France
 Institut Géographique National (IGN on Wiki FR).
India
Survey of India
 Republic of Ireland
 Ordnance Survey Ireland
 Italy
 Istituto Geografico Militare
 Japan
 Geospatial Information Authority of Japan (GSI)
 Netherlands
 Netherlands Partnership Geodetic Infrastructure (NSGI)
 Rijkswaterstaat (vertical)
 Kadaster (horizontal)
 New Zealand
 Land Information New Zealand
 Pakistan
 Survey of Pakistan
 South Africa
 Department of Rural Development and Land Reform
 Spain
 Instituto Geográfico Nacional (IGN)
 United Kingdom
 Ordnance Survey
 Ordnance Survey of Northern Ireland
 United States
 The National Geodetic Survey (NGS; formerly U.S. Coast & Geodetic Survey)
 The United States Army Corps of Engineers (USACE)
 The United States Forest Service
 The United States Geological Survey (USGS)

Notable benchmarks 
 The brass benchmark in the Amsterdam Stopera (combined city hall and opera house) is a tourist attraction, since the benchmark below the Dam square, which has been used for the zero level of Normaal Amsterdams Peil (NAP) in the Netherlands, is concealed by a manhole cover. The latter benchmark has been used also for the national zero level of other countries in northwest Europe as well as for the European Vertical Reference System (EVRS).
 Benchmark A in Washington, D.C. is miniature replica of the Washington Monument.  Installed in the late 1800s, this benchmark was used during the construction of the Monument and in subsequent surveys performed by the NGS.  Upon completion of the monument grounds, Benchmark A was buried in a brick-lined pit and concealed by a manhole cover.  In 2019, the "mini monument" was unveiled to the public for a brief time before being covered back up again.

Image gallery

See also
 Benchmarking—a recreational activity in which participants search for benchmarks using a handheld GPS receiver.
 Broad arrow
 Geoid
 Levelling—a surveying technique that uses benchmarks
 Ordnance datum
 Spot height

References

External links

 Canadian Spatial Reference System
 History of the Canadian Geodetic Survey Division
 UK benchmark database
 Detailed description of the different types of UK benchmark
 US NGS Benchmarks overlaid on a Google Map
 Benchmarks and levelling points
 Benchmarks in the UK, mostly Gloucestershire, plus Gibraltar & Barcelona

Surveying and geodesy markers
Vertical position